Ben Mamadou Konaté (born 3 January 1989) is a footballer who plays as a defensive midfielder.

Born in the Ivory Coast, he played for the Equatorial Guinea national team.

Club career
Konaté has played for several clubs in Ivory Coast: Lazer, Réveil Daloa, Stade d'Abidjan, ASEC Mimosas (when Ivorian Romaric was still there) and Africa Sports. After that, he went to Burkina Faso, where he played football for Faso-Yennenga, and Equatorial Guinea, disputing the 2008 CAF Champions League (preliminary round) for Renacimiento.

In 2008, he was in the Moroccan football.

In January 2012 due to his performances in the 2012 Africa Cup of Nations (playing for Equatorial Guinea), he attracted interest from Portuguese club Benfica.

From 2016 to 2017, Konaté played for Dumlupınar TSK in the Turkish Cypriot KTFF Süper Lig.

International career
He played in several youth teams of the Ivory Coast national football team. He switched in 2009 to Equatorial Guinea and played his debut in the 2010 season. In January 2012 he was called up to the national side to be part of the squad to play in the 2012 Africa Cup of Nations.

References

External links
 

1986 births
Living people
Association football midfielders
Footballers from Abidjan
Equatoguinean footballers
Equatorial Guinea international footballers
Ivorian footballers
Stade d'Abidjan players
ASEC Mimosas players
Africa Sports d'Abidjan players
ASFA Yennenga players
Al Hala SC players
Ivorian expatriate footballers
Ivorian expatriate sportspeople in Burkina Faso
Expatriate footballers in Burkina Faso
Ivorian expatriate sportspeople in Morocco
Expatriate footballers in Morocco
Ivorian expatriate sportspeople in Iraq
Expatriate footballers in Iraq
Ivorian expatriate sportspeople in Bahrain
Expatriate footballers in Bahrain
Ivorian expatriate sportspeople in Oman
Expatriate footballers in Oman
Ivorian expatriate sportspeople in Northern Cyprus
Expatriate footballers in Northern Cyprus
Ivorian emigrants to Equatorial Guinea
Naturalized citizens of Equatorial Guinea
2012 Africa Cup of Nations players
The Panthers F.C. players